is a waterfall located in the city of Tsuruoka, Yamagata Prefecture, Japan, on a branch of the Bonji River. It is one of "Japan's Top 100 Waterfalls", in a listing published by the Japanese Ministry of the Environment in 1990.
As the name of the falls implies, it splits into seven streams over a large  outcrop of dacite. The falls were formerly on the pilgrimage route to the sacred Three Mountains of Dewa.

External links
 Ministry of Environment 
 Tsuruoka City Tourist Information website 

Waterfalls of Japan
Landforms of Yamagata Prefecture
Tourist attractions in Yamagata Prefecture